Karl Abrahamsson Løkin (born 19 April 1991) is a Faroese international footballer who plays for Faroese club ÍF Fuglafjørður as a midfielder.

Career

Løkin started his career at ÍF Fuglafjørður before joining NSÍ Runavík. He then spent a short time in Iceland with Víkingur Ó. Løkin then rejoined NSÍ Runavík, before rejoining ÍF Fuglafjørður on 1 January 2014.

In August 2014, Løkin joined Danish club Næstved Boldklub on a deal until the end of 2016. However, his contract was terminated by mutual consent on 27 February 2015. He played five games for Næstved, two of them from the first minute.

Løkin has played four times for the senior Faroe Islands national football team and eight times at under-21 level.

Personal life

He is the younger brother of fellow Faroese International footballer Bogi Løkin, and both are sons of former Faroese international midfielder Abraham Løkin.

References

External links
 

1991 births
Living people
People from Fuglafjørður
Faroese footballers
Faroese expatriate footballers
Faroe Islands international footballers
Association football midfielders
ÍF Fuglafjørður players
NSÍ Runavík players
Ungmennafélagið Víkingur players
Næstved Boldklub players
Víkingur Gøta players
Faroe Islands Premier League players
Danish 2nd Division players
1. deild karla players
Faroese expatriate sportspeople in Iceland
Expatriate footballers in Iceland
Expatriate men's footballers in Denmark